The Pitchfork Music Festival 2015 was held on July 17 to 19, 2015 at the Union Park, Chicago, United States. The festival was headlined by Wilco, Sleater-Kinney and Chance the Rapper.

Lineup
Headline performers are listed in boldface. Artists listed from latest to earliest set times.

Notes

References

External links

2015 music festivals
Pitchfork Music Festival